Charles William Gordon may refer to:

  Charles William Gordon (1860–1937), Canadian novelist who used the pen name Ralph Connor
 Charles William Gordon (MP) (1817–1863), British Conservative politician